Patnala J Sudhakar (born 1 December 1957) obtained 110 degrees and creating a World Record. Sudhakar is the only living man to hold this record after Maharashtra's Shrikant Jichkar, having 25 degrees, and Karanataka's Yagyaneshwaran having 32 degrees, both not alive anymore.

Early life
Patnala J Sudhakar was born in Pedagadi village, Pendurthi mandal of Visakhapatnam district, Andhra Pradesh. His family were agricultural labourers. Sudhakar had to stop his studies after high school due to poverty. Sudhakar took to grazing buffaloes for a monthly fee besides attending to farm work. However, at the age of 20, Sudhakar joined the CBI as a junior assistant. He earned 10 degrees a year later through correspondence courses and open universities. In the 1980s, he obtained his first law degree.

Education
Sudhakar obtained over 110 degrees. As of June 2014, he is pursuing M. A. Anthropology from IGNOU and Ph.D. in Human Rights from Dr. Bhimrao Ambedkar University.

Career
Sudhakar contested for president of India in 2012; he filed his nomination papers on 29 July 2012. Sudhakar has 35 years of experience in Teaching, Administration and Mass Media. He has worked in several organisations like the CBI, DCI, MMTC, Press Information Bureau (PIB), All India Radio, Doordarshan, Publications Division and Ministry of Defence. He passed the Civil Services Examination in 1987 and went to work for the Indian Information Service (IIS).

Sudhakar is working as Additional Director General Press Information Bureau(PIB), Bhopal. He is the official biographer and historian of Ravuri Bharadwaja, Winner of the 2012 Jnanpeeth Award.

He led workshops on media, news writing, protection of wetlands, RTI, minorities rights, empowerment of the disabled, intellectual property rights and social issues. Sudhakar has conducted personality development classes.

He is an advisor to Institute of Education Research and Development, a diploma mill which as of 2012 was selling degrees or doctorates for the same fee of Rs 48,550. He was Chairman of Media Relations Committee – Global Forum for Public Relations and Founder President – National Public Relation Association of India. He has been a visiting or guest professor at many Indian universities.

Books and writings

Sudhakar has done research on the writings, poems, novels and life of Dr Ravoori Bharadwaja. He has written a book on his life Smruti sahityam loo ee shatabdi goppa rachayita dr ravoori bharadwaj which was released by the Chief Minister of Andhra Pradesh, Nallari Kiran Kumar Reddy on 2 May 2013 in Ravindra Bharati, Hyderabad. He also wrote two more books Ravoori Bharadwaja – titled Sahithya Jeevana Samaram and a book in Hindi.

Sudhakar have published an article of Ravoori Bharadwaja in Yojana in 1999, July edition while serving as the Editor of Yojana, Hyderabad. The article presents the brief biography and literary values of Bharadwaja's literature.

He wrote about Akkineni Nageswara Rao and his works. He has written books on various social issues.

Awards
 He received Raja Ram Mohan Roy Mission National Award in 2009.
 He received Life Term Achievement Award in 2010 from Chaitanya Art Theatres, Hyderabad.

References

1957 births
Living people